Sime is a surname which traces back to the Clan Fraser, and the name Shimidh, Gaelic for Simon. It may refer to one of these:

 Dave Sime (1936-2016), an American athlete
 Ruth Lewin Sime (1939- ), American author
 Sidney Sime (1867-1941), a British artist
 Sime Darby, a Malaysian company
 The Sime - Gen Universe, a fictional world for a series of stories by Jacqueline Lichtenberg
 Sime Silverman (1877-1933), founder of the show business publication Variety

Other uses 

 Security Intelligence Middle East (SIME), a British intelligence organization in the Middle East during the Second World War

See also
Šime (disambiguation)